Manka Dhingra (born 1973 or 1974) is an Indian-American attorney and politician who is a Washington State senator. A member of the Democratic Party, she was elected to represent the 45th legislative district, on Seattle's Eastside in King County, during a 2017 special election. Dhingra is the first Sikh elected to any state legislature in the United States.

Dhingra, an Indian immigrant, founded the woman's advocacy organization API Chaya in 1996, and later worked under several elected officials at the state level. She joined the King County Prosecuting Attorney's office in 2000 and has led the department's expanding mental health and veterans courts.

Early life and education

Dhingra was born in Bhopal, India to a Sikh family; her father worked for Union Carbide and her mother was a schoolteacher. After her father died of colon cancer, Dhingra moved to California with her mother at the age of 13, joining her relatives. She graduated from the University of California, Berkeley, earning a Bachelor of Arts in history and political science in 1995, before moving with her husband Harjit Singh to Redmond, Washington.

Career 
Dhingra founded Chaya, a non-profit organization to combat domestic violence against South Asian women, in 1996. She would later work in the offices of state Supreme Court justice Barbara Madsen and the Attorney General Christine Gregoire, while earning a degree from the University of Washington School of Law in 1999. Dhingra joined the King County Prosecuting Attorney's office in 2000 and served as a Senior Deputy Prosecuting Attorney for King County. Her work in the office's mental health court and the King County District Court Regional Veterans Court earned membership in various mental health and anti-hate crime advocacy organizations.

Dhingra identified herself as a nonpartisan prior to the 2016 presidential election. A few months after attending her first Democratic meeting, she declared her candidacy for the special election created by the death of Republican Andy Hill. Dhingra defeated Jinyoung Englund, the Republican nominee, on November 7, 2017, with 55% of the votes. Dhingra's election overturned the Republican coalition majority in the Washington State Senate, giving the Washington Democratic Party complete control over the state's government for the first time since 2012. She was sworn in on November 29 and became the first Sikh woman to enter a state legislature. Dhingra was named as the deputy majority leader in the Senate and assigned as the chair of the Behavioral Health Subcommittee. She retained the 45th district seat by being re-elected in 2018.

Personal life

Dhingra met her husband, Harjit Singh, while at the University of California, Berkeley. Singh works for SpaceX in Redmond. The couple have two teenage children.

References

External links

Living people
21st-century American politicians
American politicians of Indian descent
Asian-American people in Washington (state) politics
University of California, Berkeley alumni
University of Washington School of Law alumni
Democratic Party Washington (state) state senators
Women state legislators in Washington (state)
Politicians from Bhopal
People from Redmond, Washington
American Sikhs
1973 births
21st-century American women politicians